Lesya Ukrainka National Academic Theater (also referred to as Lesya Ukrainka Theater) is a theater in Kyiv, Ukraine. It is located in a building known as Bourgogne Theatre.

Founded in 1926, the theater produces many important plays of Russian and Ukrainian dramatic art. Its repertoire consists of plays by famous playwrights such as Fyodor Dostoevsky, Mikhail Bulgakov and others. Many current movie actors have started their career in the theater. 

The theatre traces its roots to the Solovtsov theatric troupe that existed in Kyiv since 1891 and also performed in the Bourgogne Theatre. Later the troupe was named as the Russian Drama Theatre.

Bourgogne Theatre
The building was originally designed in 1875 by Vladimir Nikolayev and sponsored by a French entrepreneur Augustin Bourgogne. At first it housed the Kyiv city circus. From 1891 to 1898 the building was leased to the first drama company in Kyiv, Solovtsov Theater. In 1896 the theater put on its first cinema showing. The present company has been in the building since 1929, and named after Lesya Ukrainka in 1941.

In 2022, due to the Russian invasion of Ukraine was renamed from Lesya Ukrainka National Academic Theater of Russian Drama to Lesya Ukrainka National Academic Theater.

See also
 Ivan Franko National Academic Drama Theater, the original Solovtsov Theater building

References

1926 establishments in Ukraine
Russian-Ukrainian culture
National Landmarks in Kyiv
Institutions with the title of National in Ukraine